Ronald Benson (26 March 1925 – 6 November 1997) was an English professional footballer who played as a winger in the Football League for York City, and in non-League football for Archbishop Holgates Old Boys and Frickley Colliery. After retiring he became a union representative in the British Rail workshops in York, and stood as the Conservative Party candidate for Wakefield in the 1966 general election, in which he was defeated by the Labour Party candidate.

References

1925 births
Footballers from York
1997 deaths
English footballers
Association football forwards
York City F.C. players
Frickley Athletic F.C. players
English Football League players
Conservative Party (UK) people